Bonita Lawrence is a Mi'kmaw writer, scholar, and professor in the Department of Equity Studies at York University in Toronto, Canada. Her work focuses on issues related to Indigenous identity and governance, equity, and racism in Canada. She is also a traditional singer at political rallies, social events, and prisons in the Toronto and Kingston areas.

Early life 
Bonita Lawrence is Mi'kmaw, with Acadian and English heritage as well. She was raised in Montreal. She and her five siblings were raised by their mother after their father, a working-class expatriate Brit, left his wife and six children. Lawrence's mother was Mi'kmaw, however she denied her Indigenous identify in an effort to keep social workers away after her husband left. As a result, Lawrence grew up under the guise of being white.

Education 
Lawrence obtained a Bachelor of Science in Geology from the University of Toronto, a Masters of Environmental Studies from York University and a PhD in Sociology at the Ontario Institute for Studies in Education at the University of Toronto.

Career 
As a faculty member at York University, Lawrence has influenced the academic programs and campus life at York University. She was a founding member of the undergraduate program in Race, Ethnicity and Indigeneity, now offered as Multicultural and Indigenous Studies in the Department of Equity Studies, the only program of its kind in Canada.

Lawrence's research and publications focus primarily on urban, non-status and Metis identities, federally unrecognized Aboriginal communities, and Indigenous justice.

Her work on racism, equity and decolonization has become an important resource for those working in the area. "Decolonizing Anti-Racism," a work co-published with Enakshi Dua is reference on many social justice websites. Her 2012 book: Fractured Homeland: Federal Recognition and Algonquin Identity in Ontario was short-listed for the 2013 Canada Prize in the Social Sciences by the Federation for the Humanities and Social Sciences (Canada).

Alongside her academic endeavours, Lawrence has written N'In D'la Owey Innklan: Mi'kmaq Sojourns in England, a historical novel that spans 500 years of Mi'kmaq history in both Atlantic Canada and London, England. 

She has also been a member of Community Council, Diversion Program for Aboriginal Offenders (2007- 2010), a Member of Aboriginal Legal Services of Toronto (1998-2005), Member of Board of Directors, Anduhyaun Inc. (2000-2001) and Member of Board of Directors (1998-2004), Katorokwi Native Friendship Centre, Kingston, Ontario.

Publications

References 

Living people
20th-century First Nations writers
21st-century First Nations writers
Canadian indigenous women academics
First Nations academics
First Nations women writers
Mi'kmaq people
Academic staff of York University
Year of birth missing (living people)
20th-century Canadian women writers